Progeronia is a genus of ammonites belonging to the family Perisphinctidae.

These fast-moving nektonic carnivores lived in the Jurassic period, from 155.7 to 150.8 Ma.

Species
Species within this genus include:
Progeronia breviceps
Progeronia lictor
Progeronia polyplocoides

Description
These large shell are large and involute, with a bifurcated or trifurcated ribs.

Distribution
Fossils of species within this genus have been found in the Jurassic sediments of Algeria and Hungary.

References

External links
 Jsd Ammonites

Ammonites of Europe
Fossils of Algeria
Jurassic ammonites
Ammonitida genera
Perisphinctidae